Leith's softshell turtle (Nilssonia leithii) is a species of turtle in the family Trionychidae. The species is found in peninsular Indian rivers including the Thungabhadra, Ghataprabha, Bhavani, Godavari, Kaveri and Moyar Rivers. The type locality is Pune in India.

Etymology
The specific name, leithii, is in honor of Andrew H. Leith, a physician with the Bombay Sanitary Commission.

Description
Nilssonia leithii is intermediate between Nilssonia gangetica and Nilssonia hurum. It is like the former in the width of the interorbital apace, the comparatively short mandibular symphysis, and the markings of the head. It is like the latter in the longer and more pointed snout, the absence of a strong ridge on the inner alveolar surface of the mandible, and in the presence, in the young, of four or more dorsal ocelli, which are, however, smaller than in N. hurum.

Diet
Nilssonia leithii preys on mosquito larvae, crabs, freshwater molluscs, and fish. They also sometimes feed on small aquatic vegetation.

Reproduction
The adult female N. leithii lays eggs in June. The eggs are spherical, and the diameter of each egg is 30 to 31 mm (1.2 in).

Threats 
This species is locally exploited throughout peninsular India. Other major threats are riverine development projects, aquatic pollution, sand mining, construction of hydroelectric projects, poaching, exploitation of eggs,.

Geographic range 
Leith's softshell turtle is endemic to peninsular India in the Indian states of Andhra Pradesh, Karnataka, Kerala, Madhya Pradesh, Maharashtra, Tamil Nadu and Odisha

References

Further reading
Gray JE (1872). "Notes on the Mud-Tortoises of India (Trionyx, Geoffroy)". Ann. Mag. Nat. Hist., Fourth Series 10: 326–340. (Trionyx leithii, new species, 334–335).

External links

External links

Nilssonia (turtle)
Reptiles of India
Endemic fauna of India
Reptiles described in 1872
Taxa named by John Edward Gray